Probolinggo–Banyuwangi Toll Road (Probowangi Toll Road) is a toll road in East Java. The toll road will connect Probolinggo Regency, Situbondo Regency and Banyuwangi Regency. The toll road will be integrated with Port of Ketapang to allow crossing from Java to Bali. The toll road is the final phase of Trans-Java Toll Road with Port of Merak on the western end. It is currently under route planning phase, but the construction of the first phase of this toll road was expected to be operational around 2024.

History
The groundbreaking for the first section of the toll road was done on 6 February 2023 by the Minister of Public Works and Housing, Basuki Hadimuljono with expectations that the first phase will be operating in 2024.

Sections
The toll road is divided into 6 sections:
 Section 1: Kraksaan–Paiton, 
 Section 2: Paiton–Besuki, 
 Section 3: Besuki–Situbondo, 
 Section 4: Situbondo–Asembagus, 
 Section 5: Asembagus–Bajulmati, 
 Section 6: Bajulmati–Ketapang,

See also
Trans-Java Toll Road

References

Toll roads in Java
Transport in East Java
Toll roads in Indonesia